ITU-R Recommendation BT.656, sometimes also called ITU656, describes a simple digital video protocol for streaming uncompressed PAL or NTSC standard-definition television (625 or 525 lines) signals. The protocol builds upon the 4:2:2 digital video encoding parameters defined in ITU-R Recommendation BT.601, which provides interlaced video data, streaming each field separately, and uses the YCbCr color space and a 13.5 MHz sampling frequency for pixels.

The standard can be implemented to transmit either 8-bit values (the standard in consumer electronics) or 10-bit values (sometimes used in studio environments). Both a parallel and a serial transmission format are defined. For the parallel format, a 25-pin D-Sub connector pinout and ECL logic levels are defined. The serial format can be transmitted over 75-ohm coaxial cable with BNC connectors, but there is also a fibre-optical version defined.

The parallel version of the ITU-R BT.656 protocol is also used in many TV sets between chips using CMOS logic levels. Typical applications include the interface between a PAL/NTSC decoder chip and a DAC integrated circuit for driving a CRT in a TV set.

Data format 
A BT.656 data stream is a sequence of 8-bit or 10-bit words, transmitted at a rate of 27 Mword/s. Horizontal scan lines of video pixel data are delimited in the stream by 4-byte long SAV (Start of Active Video) and EAV (End of Active Video) code sequences. SAV codes also contain status bits indicating line position in a video field or frame. Line position in a full frame can be determined by tracking SAV status bits, allowing receivers to 'synchronize' with an incoming stream.

Individual pixels in a line are coded in YCbCr format. After an SAV code (4 bytes) is sent, the first 8 bits of Cb (chroma U) data are sent then 8 bits of Y (luma), followed by 8 bits of Cr (chroma V) for the next pixel and then 8 bits of Y. To reconstruct full resolution Y, Cb, Cr pixel values, chroma upsampling must be used.

References

See also 
 Rec. 601
 Serial digital interface

Digital television
Film and video technology
Serial digital interface
ITU-R recommendations
International Telecommunication Union